A&J may refer to:

 Adam and Joe, British comedy performers
 Arlo and Janis, comic strip
 A. & J. Inglis, shipbuilding firm founded in 1862 by Anthony Inglis and his brother John in Glasgow, Scotland

See also
 
 
 AJ (disambiguation)